The Ra'anana Express was an Israeli baseball team from Ra'anana in the now-defunct Israel Baseball League.

The Express finished the inaugural 2007 season in fifth place, 17-24 (.415), and lost to the Netanya Tigers in the quarterfinals of the 2007 championship.

History

In 2007 the team was managed by Australian Shaun Smith.

The first player selected by the Express in the inaugural 2007 draft was Australian pitcher John Thew.  The team's first game was played against the Tel Aviv Lightning on June 24, 2007, at the Sportek in Tel Aviv.

Starting pitcher Esequier Pie, from San Pedro de Macorís in the Dominican Republic, threw two no-hitters in the 2007 season.

Stadium
Located in the Baptist Village in Petah Tikva, the Yarkon Sports Complex is home to the Express as well as the Petach Tikva Pioneers and the Israeli national baseball team.

2007 roster

External links
Official site of the Ra'anana Express
South Florida Ra'anana Express Fan Club

Footnotes

Baseball teams in Israel